is a city in Fukuoka Prefecture, Japan. As of June 1, 2019, the city has an estimated population of 303,579 and a population density of 1,320 persons per km². The total area is 229.96 km².

On February 5, 2005, the town of Kitano (from Mii District), the towns of Jōjima and Mizuma (both from Mizuma District), and the town of Tanushimaru (from Ukiha District) were merged into Kurume.

Geography

Climate
Kurume has a humid subtropical climate (Köppen: Cfa).

Neighboring municipalities

Fukuoka Prefecture 

 Yame
 Asakura
 Ukiha
 Okawa
 Chikugo
 Ogōri
 Ōki
 Hirokawa
 Tachirai

Saga Prefecture 

 Tosu
 Kanzaki
 Miyaki

Demographics
Per Japanese census data, the population of Kurume in 2020 is 303,316 people. Kurume has been conducting censuses since 1960.

Industry

Traditional products

Education

Universities
 Kurume University
 Kurume University Hospital
 Kurume Institute of Technology
 St.Mary's College
 Kurume Shin-Ai Women's College

Transport
Kurume Station is served by the Kyushu Shinkansen and Kyudai Main Line east to Oita, while Nishitetsu Kurume Station is served by the Nishitetsu Amagi Line.

Sister cities 
Kurume is twinned with these cities.
 Kōriyama, Fukushima, Japan
 Modesto, California, United States
 Hefei, Anhui, China

Notable people born or raised in Kurume
In chronological order of birth year:
Tanaka Hisashige (1799-1881) Engineer and Inventor who started the company which became Toshiba.
George Shima (1864–1926), "Potato King" of California.
Shigeru Aoki (1882–1911), Western-style artist.
Shōjirō Ishibashi (1889–1976), founder of Bridgestone Corporation, which originated in Kurume as traditional footwear manufacturers, producing the sock-like shoe (jika-tabi) used by farmers; they found that by coating the bottom of tabi with rubber, farmers could be protected from the invasion of parasitic worms that live in rice paddies.
Harue Koga (1895–1933), eclectic avant-garde artist and poet.
Susumu Fujita (1912–1990/91), actor.
Leiji Matsumoto (1938–present), manga artist, anime character designer and animator.
 Seiji Sakaguchi (1942-present), Japanese professional wrestler and judoka
Ryo Ishibashi (1956–present), actor.
Seiko Matsuda (1962–present), singer and actress.
Fumiya Fujii (1962–present), lead vocalist of The Checkers (Japanese band).
Izumi Sakai (1967–2007), lead vocalist of Zard; born in Kurume, but raised in Kanagawa.
Rena Tanaka (1980–present), actress.
Kanikapila 7 piece Pop Band.
Leo Ieiri (1994–present), singer, songwriter.

See also
Chikugo River

References

External links

 
 

 
Cities in Fukuoka Prefecture